Events in the year 1924 in Brazil.

Incumbents

Federal government 
 President: Artur Bernardes 
 Vice President: Estácio de Albuquerque Coimbra

Governors 
 Alagoas: José Fernandes de Barros Lima (till 12 June); Pedro da Costa Rego (from 12 June)
 Amazonas: César do Rego Monteiro (until 30 October); Raimundo Rodrigues Barbosa (30 October - 2 December); Alfredo Sá
 Bahia: José Joaquim Seabra, then Góis Calmon
 Ceará: 
 till 12 July: Ildefonso Albano
 from 12 July: José Moreira da Rocha
 Goiás:
 till March 31: Miguel da Rocha Lima
 March 31 - April 25: Joaquim Rufino Ramos Jubé
 from April 25: Miguel da Rocha Lima
 Maranhão: Godofredo Mendes Viana
 Mato Grosso: Pedro Celestino Corrêa da Costa, then Estêvão Alves Correia
 Minas Gerais: 
 till 4 August: Raul Soares
 4 August - 21 December: Olegário Maciel
 from 21 December: Fernando de Mello Viana
 Pará: Antônio Emiliano de Sousa
 Paraíba: 
 till 22 October: Sólon Barbosa de Lucena
 from 22 October: João Suassuna
 Paraná: Caetano Munhoz da Rocha
 Pernambuco: Sérgio Teixeira Lins de Barros Loreto
 Piauí:
 till 1 July: João Luís Ferreira
 from 1 July: Matias Olímpio de Melo
 Rio Grande do Norte: José Augusto Bezerra de Medeiros
 Rio Grande do Sul: Antônio Augusto Borges de Medeiros
 Santa Catarina: Hercílio Luz (until 20 October)
 São Paulo: 
 Sergipe:

Vice governors 
 Rio Grande do Norte:
 São Paulo:

Events 
Colégio Campos Salles, private school is founded.
4 May – Among competitors at the Summer Olympics are eight Brazilian athletes, two rowers and a sport shooter.  The country does not win any medals.

Arts and culture

Films 
Gigolete, directed by Vittorio Verga and starring Augusto Aníbal
O Trem da Morte, starring Arturo Carrari
Paulo e Virginia, directed by Francisco de Almeida Fleming

Books
Oswald de Andrade – Memórias Sentimentais de João Miramar

Births 
25 April – Paulo Machado de Carvalho Filho, businessman and impresario (died 2010)
13 May – Sérgio Hingst, actor (died 2004)
4 June – Adelmar Faria Coimbra-Filho, biologist and primatologist, after whom Coimbra Filho's titi is named after him. (died 2016)
13 August 
Helena Meireles, guitarist and composer (died 2005)
Serafim Fernandes de Araújo, cardinal (died 2019)
10 October – Lídia Mattos, actress (died 2013)
24 October – Aziz Ab'Sáber, environmentalist (died 2012)

Deaths 
31 March – Nilo Peçanha, politician, former President and Vice-President (born 1867)
21 May 
 Blessed Adílio Daronch, student (born 1908; shot and killed by revolutionaries)
 Blessed Manuel Gómez González, missionary (born 1877)
20 October – Hercílio Luz, politician (born 1860)

References

See also 
1924 in Brazilian football

 
1920s in Brazil
Years of the 20th century in Brazil
Brazil
Brazil